Henro-Pierre Swart (born 17 March 1989) is a professional South African rugby union player, currently playing with the . His regular position is flanker or number eight.

Career

Youth and Varsity Cup rugby

Swart attended Hoërskool Framesby in Port Elizabeth, playing first team cricket as well as rugby alongside future provincial rugby players like Cameron Jacobs, Juan Language and Rhyk Welgemoed.

In 2009, Swart moved to Kimberley, Northern Cape, where he was a member the  side that played in the 2009 Under-21 Provincial Championship. The following year, he made the move to Potchefstroom and represented the  side in the 2010 edition of the same competition.

He played Varsity Cup rugby for Potchefstroom-based university side  between 2012 and 2014, making thirteen appearances over the three seasons.

Leopards

He made a total of four starts during the competition and also scored his first senior try in the last of those appearances, against former side  in a narrow 42–40 defeat.

References

South African rugby union players
Living people
1989 births
Rugby union players from Port Elizabeth
Rugby union flankers
Rugby union number eights
Leopards (rugby union) players